Vladimir Grigoryevich Yermolaev (29 August 1909  31 December 1944) was a Soviet aircraft designer, general-major of the aviation engineering service. He graduated from the Moscow State University in 1931.

Yermolaev was a leading engineer in development of the Bartini "Stal-7" aircraft. Yermolayev became the chief of OKB-240 in 1939, after Bartini was arrested and interned in a Siberian Gulag; he led the development and production of Stal-7–based long-range bomber DB-240/Yer-2/Yer-4 and its variants with Charomskiy ACh-30 diesel engines.

Yermolaev died in 1944 due to a typhoid infection.

Aircraft
Yermolaev Yer-2

See also
Yermolaev Design Bureau

References

1909 births
1944 deaths
Russian aerospace engineers
Soviet engineers
20th-century Russian engineers
Deaths from typhoid fever